The European Tour 2015/2016 – Event 3 (also known as the 2015 Ruhr Open) was a professional minor-ranking snooker tournament that took place between 7–11 October 2015 in Mülheim, Germany.

Shaun Murphy was the defending champion, but he lost 1–4 to Tian Pengfei in the last 16.

Barry Pinches and Alan McManus played what was, at the time, snooker's longest ever official frame. In the sixth frame of their first round meeting they battled for 100 minutes and 24 seconds.

Prize fund
The breakdown of prize money of the event is shown below:

Main draw

Preliminary rounds

Round 1
Best of 7 frames

Round 2
Best of 7 frames

Round 3 
Best of 7 frames

Main rounds

Top half

Section 1

Section 2

Section 3

Section 4

Bottom half

Section 5

Section 6

Section 7

Section 8

Finals

Century breaks 

141, 111  Stuart Carrington
140, 135  Luca Brecel
140  Ross Muir
136, 134, 112  Mike Dunn
135, 130, 104, 100  Robert Milkins
134  Kyren Wilson
133, 129, 100  David Gilbert
133, 103  Kishan Hirani
133  James Cahill
132, 130  Mark Davis
131  Stephen Maguire
130  Mitchell Mann
128, 115, 106  Tian Pengfei
126  Graeme Dott
124  Ashley Carty
123, 109  Anthony McGill
122, 121  Dominic Dale
121, 104  Mark Allen
120  Ben Woollaston

120  Ashley Hugill
116  Rod Lawler
112  Hammad Miah
112  Josh Boileau
109  Neil Robertson
108  Shaun Murphy
108  Gerard Greene
108  Kurt Maflin
107  David Grace
106  Ali Carter
106  Chris Wakelin
105  Barry Hawkins
104  Mark Selby
104  Li Hang
104  Scott Donaldson
103  Alan McManus
102  Andrew Higginson
101  Joe Perry

References

2015
ET3
2015 in German sport